Mihailo Jovanović (Serbian Cyrillic: Михаило Јовановић; born 15 February 1989) is a Serbian professional footballer who plays as a centre-back for Malaysia Super League club Kuching City.

External links
 Player Information on MFK Karviná website
 
 Player Information on Livesport.cz
 Profile at srbijafudbal.com

1989 births
Living people
Sportspeople from Užice
Serbian footballers
Association football defenders
Serbian expatriate footballers
Czech First League players
Serbian First League players
Belarusian Premier League players
Kazakhstan Premier League players
Serbian SuperLiga players
Maltese Premier League players
FK Sloboda Užice players
FK Mladost Lučani players
FK Sloga Požega players
1. HFK Olomouc players
MFK Karviná players
FC Zbrojovka Brno players
FK Voždovac players
FC Neman Grodno players
FC Taraz players
FK Inđija players
Valletta F.C. players
FC Alashkert players
FK Dinamo Samarqand players
Serbian expatriate sportspeople in the Czech Republic
Serbian expatriate sportspeople in Belarus
Serbian expatriate sportspeople in Kazakhstan
Serbian expatriate sportspeople in Malta
Expatriate footballers in the Czech Republic
Expatriate footballers in Belarus
Expatriate footballers in Kazakhstan
Expatriate footballers in Malta
Expatriate footballers in Armenia
Expatriate footballers in Uzbekistan